The Quinnipiac were a subdivision or "sachemship" of the Wappinger people, an Algonquian Indigenous people of the Northeastern Woodlands. They were based in the center region of present-day New Haven County, Connecticut. They spoke the Quiripi language. 

The Quinnipiac people are considered to be the first of the indigenous peoples to be placed on a reservation (by the English in 1638), under the first of several treaties.

James Hammond Trumbull was the first to recognize that the New Haven band of the Quiripi was only one band or sub-sachemship and not the entire tribal nation.

Name 

The Quinnipiac is the English name for the Eansketambawg (meaning "original people"), also known as cf. Ojibwe: Anishinaabeg and Blackfoot: Niitsítapi).

The Dutch and French called these people Quiripi, and the English knew them as Quinnipiac.

Their name is also spelled Quinnipiack,  Quiripey, and Quillipiac

They called their homeland the Wampanoki (i.e., "Dawnland"; c.f., Ojibwe: Waabanaki, Abenaki: Wabanakiyik) region.

Language 
The Quinnipiac people spoke the Quiripi language, also known as Wampano, Quiripi, Unquachog, or Mattabesic or Wampano. It was a poorly attested r-dialect of the Algonquian language family. It went extinct at the end of the 19th century or early 20th century.

Society and politics 

The Quinnipiac consisted of the following sociopolitical elements.

Primary sachemdom 
A primary sachemdom (likened to a kingdom, aboriginal domain, etc.), where a hereditary Long-House Grand Sachem presided over an alliance of Stump-Chief Sachems (non-hereditary, but holding positions by virtue of marriage or appointment) and Sagamores/Sagamaughs (hereditary positions), all of whom acted as wise councilors. The Algonquian primary sachemdom was always located at the heart or center of the domain, where a traditional maweomi  (central council fire) was positioned. The sachemdom was defended by Indian forts or menehkenum which the English called "entrenched castles."

Secondary sub-sachemships 
Secondary sub-sachemships (bands) were genetically, culturally, politically, socially, economically, and linguistically related to and defended the central council fire. The central council fires in turn, were allied with a Great Grand Council known as a Confederacy.

Long Water Land sachemdom 

The Long Water Land sachemdom included the following sachemships (circa 1500-1650 AD).

 Quinnipiac/Quirripeokke: Quinnipiac River confluence, New Haven
 Meriden (meaning "Pleasant Valley") Cheshire, North Haven and Meriden
 Mioonkhtuck:  East Haven, Fair Haven
 Totoket:  Branford, North Branford
 Menunkatuck:  Guilford, Madison
 Hammonasset:  Clinton, Saybrook
 Nehantic:  Durham, Haddam
 Tunxis:  Farmington
 Mattatuck:  Waterbury
 Naugatuck:  Derby, Ansonia, Orange
 Wepawaug:  Milford
 Paugusset:  New London
 Potatuck:  Housatonic River
 Wangunk: Mattabesec or Middletown
 Podunk:  Windsor

Throughout the sachemdom, the menuhkenumoag (Indian forts) were positioned along the main trail system, known as Mishimayagat. Trails and rivers served as highways for war and trade.

The Mattabesec Sachemship in the heart of Wangunk sub-sachemships was the easternmost entrance to the Wappinger-Mattabesec Confederacy and prior to the major epidemics of the 16th-17th century, this eastern door was where Rhode Island is now (and the eastern border of Connecticut).

Populations and treaty reservation land

Population prior to contact with Europeans 
Prior to the devastating epidemics (according to contemporary scholars Snow, Grumet, Bragdon, et al.), the estimated population was about 25,000 in Connecticut, an additional 25,000 in Eastern New York and New Jersey (Northern Mountains). This equates to roughly 1,000 to 1,200 per band or sub-sachemship (called 'sub-tribes' by ethnologists). The Connecticut Scholar, per Collier & Collier, indicates that the figures estimated by DeForest (and emulated by Townshend) circa 1850–1900, are no longer taken seriously.

The Quinnipiac Reservation 
The Quinnipiac reservation at Mioonhktuck (East Haven) is said to be the first reservation in what would become the United States over a century later, as a result of the first Quinnipiac/English Treaty signed in November 1638. Additional reserved lands were recorded by the late John Menta in his thesis and subsequent work about the Quinnipiac. There were three major treaties, and one ratification by Naushop, the son of Shaumpishuh. These treaties were with the British Crown and, as such, were ratified by the U.S. Constitution, according to U.S. Supreme Court decisions. Reserved land locations included:

  reserve at Mioonkhtuck, East Haven
 reserved lands at Indian Head, Totoket, Branford
 reserved lands at Ruttawoo (East River), Madison
 reserved lands at Menunkatuck, Guilford, West Pond
 reserved lands at Derby, Orange, Turkey Hill
 reserved  at Waterbury (negotiated but never solidified).

Quinnipiac refugees 
Quinnipiac people became refugees as a result of the encroachment, religious conversion, and ethnic cleansing by the Puritans. Large groups, who could not remain at the regional reserved lands, embarked on a series of removals to other Algonquian groups. Some of these included, but were not limited to the Schaghticoke enclave, which began in the year 1699, after old Joseph Chuse married Sarah Mahwee (Mahweeyeuh). Sarah told Ezra Stiles of Yale that she was born at East Haven and Dr. Blair Rudes confirmed that she was indeed Quinnipiac. Joseph was a Paugusset and they were a sub-sachemship of the Long Water People, as noted by James Hammond Trumbull. The last families who had been at Turkey Hill/Naugatuck moved to Kent, Connecticut, where the Schaghticoke emerged. Today they have split into the Schaghticoke Nation and the Schaghticoke Tribe.

Other groups of refugees migrated to Brotherton at Oneida, New York, then to the White River and Muncie, Indiana; some to Stockbridge, Massachusetts, and Stockbridge, Wisconsin; some to Odanak (St. Francis) in Quebec, Canada.

War and peace 
The Quinnipiac were known as "grandfathers" in the Dawnland Confederacy, with their Lenape cousins. Although they were a people of peace and commerce, when forced into war, they were fierce warriors and outstanding soldiers. Eastern Connecticut, originally inhabited by the Quinnipiac Nation's sub-sachemships of the Eastern Nehantic, Podunk, and Wangunk, as well as the Narragansett, suffered more losses than western Connecticut, and so in 1506, after 80% population losses due to epidemics, the Pequotoog moved into the area from the upper Hudson region and pushed the survivors of the Narragansett into what is now Rhode Island, and the Nehantic wedged in close to the Connecticut River (Old Lyme). A rogue sachem, named Uncus, angry for having been passed over to lead the Pequotoog, took his followers and struck out on his own, founding the Mohegan Band. Uncus and his warriors joined with Nepaupuck (a Quinnipiac War Captain) and entered into several treaties with the English. In the "Direful Swamp Fight," 150 Quinnipiac and Mohegan warriors joined with 350 English troops and, in December 1675, they defeated the powerful Pequotoog. Quinnipiac warriors served in many wars and battles as soldiers and sailors and as subsequent refugees, who migrated to Stockbridge, merged into an alliance to help the Sons of Liberty defeat the English in the American Revolution because of the betrayal by English allies in land dealings.  The Sons of Liberty changed their name to the Sons of King Tammany (a Munsee Grand Sachem whose title, Tamanend, means "The Affable One"). The original Thirteen Colonies adopted the sociopolitical structure of the Quinnipiac Wampano Confederacy, with each state having its own totem and calling their leader a sachem.

Quinnipiac culture 
The Long Water Land people lived in their fishing camps along the shores during the spring (Sequan) and summer (Nepun). Their horticultural patterns produced corn, beans, squash, pumpkins, fruits, nuts, berries, all in a plantation-style setting. They used a slash-and-burn technique to replenish the soil and rotated their plantation sites regularly. They used horseshoe crabs and menhadden (alewives) as a natural fertilizer. They caught shell- and scalefish and dried them in the sun or on racks over a fire. The Quinnipiac were avid falconers, using hawks to keep crows away from the corn. The bean and squash plants were planted in the valleys between rows of corn, so that the beans would curl around the corn stalks and weeding was unnecessary. Many other plants considered weeds today were used by the Long Water people for food, beverages, medicine, and for making mats.

In the fall (Taquonck) the Long Water people moved inland along their trails to the winter (Pabouks) grounds, and, along the way they hunted fowl, rabbits, beaver, and other small game, until they came to Meriden "the Pleasant Valley," where oaks provided shelter against high winds and the acorns were main staples for deer and wild turkey, another winter staple.

During the Colonial period, Quinnipiac men hired out as laborers, fishermen, and guides (the English often got lost), and Quinnipiac women sold their crafts.

The Quinnipiac and other Algonquians lived in dwellings known as wigwams (elliptical houses with sapling frames covered with bark, mats, skins, or sod) and quinnekommuk (longhouses that were rectangular and two or three times as long as their width, covered with similar coverings).  Quiripi/Quinnipiac longhouses averaged thirty to one hundred feet long, by twenty feet wide, and about fifteen feet high. The bigger dwellings were sachems' houses, which often had five or six fire pits in one dwelling (because they often had their extended family living with them). Religious Society (Wampano or "Men of the Dawn," Powwauwoag, Medarennawawg, and others) had the biggest longhouses for ceremonial purposes. The Algonquin use shells as money.

They reckoned the passing of time by a lunar calendar and an eight-part ceremonial cycle, using various lithic and earth features as observatories to determine the phases of the sun, moon, and stars for planting, harvest, and ceremonies.

Individuals of importance in Quinnipiac history 
Momauguin, Quinnipiac Grand Sachem in 1638, signed the First Treaty with the English planters at Quinnipiac (New Haven), "along with others of his council,"  granting the English the use of Quinnipiac land at New Haven, the Central Council Fire of the Sachemdom, while retaining full rights to the  "reservation" as well as full rights to fish and hunt all property.	

Mantowese, sachem of Mattabesec (Middletown), to the north of New Haven, signed the Second Treaty with the English, granting them use of land in his sub-sachemship. Mantowese, the son of Sowheag, served on Momauguin's Grand Council and was the nephew of Sequin.

Shampishuh, sister to Momauguin, was the female sachem (sunksquaw) of the Menunkatuck (Guilford) Sub-sachemship, who signed the Third Treaty with the English, granting them the use of land near Madison and Guilford, but reserving land east of Kuttawoo River for her people. Shampishuh was the sister of Momauguin and niece of Quosoquonch, the sachem of nearby Totoket (Branford).  Shampishuh' son, Naushop, signed the ratification of her treaty with the English.

Quosoquonch, the sachem of  the Totoket Sub-sachemship and uncle of Shampishuh, worked with Shaumpishuh in 1639 to draw up a map (for Rev. Henry Whitfield and John Higginson) of the Quinnipiac sachemdoms from the Quinnipiac River in the west to beyond Hammonasset in the east, which included landmarks.

Sarah Mahwee (Mahweeyeuh), was born in East Haven (Mioonkhtuk Sub-sachemship). In 1699 she married Joseph Chuse (Paugusset Sub-sachemship) and together they began the Schaghticoke enclave.

Elizabeth Sakaskantawe Brown was born around 1850 and lived to be well over 100 years old, living on about  near Branford, Connecticut. Sakaskantawe (Flying Squirrel) was the last matriarch of the Totoket Band and was a descendant of James Mah-wee-yeuh, a Sachem of the Mioonkhtuk Band (East Haven), who died near Cheshire in 1745.

Religion 
The Quinnipiac people practiced a number of annual ceremonies. 

The Puritans missionized the tribes of New England. Rev. Pierson was taught by Rev. John Eliot, who founded Puritan Praying Towns, where Native converts, including any Quinnipiac who converted, settled.
 
The Quinnipiac Stone Giant Twins (Hobbomock and Maushop), as the primary culture heroes, acted as the epitomes of good and bad, right and wrong, honorable deeds and mischievous behavior. Hobbomock was, to the Quinnipiac, a benevolent spirit who taught the people how to hunt, fish, and survive the Ice Age, earthquakes, famines, etc., and he was the one prayed to when assistance was needed. The Puritans knew this, yet they forced the Long Water people to teach the children that Hobbomock was a "Bogeyman." The Puritans redefined Hobbomock, Maushop, and other Quinnipiac spirit helpers as "devils."

Quinnipiac legacy in greater New Haven and Connecticut

Cultural heritage group 

The Algonquian Confederacy of the Quinnipiac Tribal Council (ACQTC), an unrecognized tribe, is a cultural heritage organization of individuals who identify as Quinnipiac descendants.

See also 
 Brotherton Indians, Wisconsin

Notes

References

Further reading 
 Cultural Conflict in Southern New England:  A History of the Quinnipiac Indians by John Menta, Yale Press, New Haven. CT.
 Some Helps for the Indians 1658 Bilingual Catechism, by Rev. Abraham Pierson, reprinted in "Language and Lore of the Long Island Indians" Readings in Long Island Archaeology and Ethnohistory, Vol. IV, 1980. Stony Brook, NY, Suffolk County Archaeological Association.
 "The Strange Case of Nepaupuck:  Warrior or War Criminal?" in Journal of the New Haven Colony Historical Society,  Vol. 33 (2) 12–17, 1987, by John Menta.
 "The Quinnipiac Reservation:  Land and Tribal Identity," by Richard Carlson in Rooted Like the Ash Trees, Naugatuck, CT: Eagle Wing Press, 1987–1988.
 "Shaumpishuh, 'Squaw Sachem' of the Quinnipiac Indians," by John Menta in Artifacts, 1988, Vol. 16, No. 3-4, pp. 32–37.
 "Resurrecting Wampano (Quiripi) from the Dead:  Phonological Preliminaries" by Blair A. Rudes, in Anthropological Linguistics, Vol. 39, No. 1, Spring 1997.
 "Indian Names of Places, etc. In and on the Borders of Connecticut with Interpretations of Some of Them," by James Hammond Trumbull, 1881 (reprinted 1974 by Archon Books).
 Itineraries and Memoirs of Ezra Stiles, 1760-1762.  Beineke Rare Books Library, New Haven, CT.
 Visible Saints: West Haven, Connecticut, 1648 - 1798, by Peter J. Malia, (Cheshire, CT: The Connecticut Press, 2009).

External links 

 Conseil des Abénakis d'Odanak, official website
 Stockbridge-Munsee Community Band of Mohican Indians, official website
 The City of New Haven: Land of the Quinnipiac

Wappinger
Native American history of Connecticut
Native American tribes in Connecticut
Algonquian ethnonyms
Algonquian peoples
Unrecognized tribes in the United States